Chariessa vestita is a species of checkered beetle in the family Cleridae. It is found in Central America, North America, and South America.

References

Further reading

 

Cleridae
Articles created by Qbugbot
Beetles described in 1835